General elections were held in Islamabad Capital Territory on Wednesday
6 October 1993 to elect 1 member of National Assembly of Pakistan from Islamabad.

Pakistan Muslim League (N) won Islamabad seat by the margin of 9,790 votes.

Candidates 
Total no of 11 Candidates including 4 Independents contested for 1 National Assembly Seat from Islamabad.

Result 

Party Wise

Constituency wise

References 

1993 elections in Pakistan
General elections in Pakistan